Nicholas Tung Ming Bruel is an
American author and illustrator of children’s books, most notably the Bad Kitty series. The first book in the series, Bad Kitty, is an alphabet-themed picture book, and expanded series includes both picture books and chapter books, as well as a guide to drawing comics. His books have been New York Times bestsellers.

Authored-Illustrated Works

Boing!, 2004
Who is Melvin Bubble?, 2006
Little Red Bird, 2008
Bad Kitty Makes Comics . . . and You Can Too!, 2015
A Wonderful Year, 2015
Bad Kitty Picture Books
Bad Kitty, 2005
Poor Puppy, 2007
A Bad Kitty Christmas, 2011
Bad Kitty's Tasty Treats, 2014
Bad Kitty Does Not Like Dogs, 2015
Bad Kitty Does Not Like Candy, 2015
Bad Kitty Scaredy-Cat, 2016
Bad Kitty Does Not Like Snow, 2016
Bad Kitty Does Not Like Video Games, 2019
Bad Kitty Does Not Like Thanksgiving, 2019
Bad Kitty: Searching for Santa, 2019
Bedtime for Bad Kitty, 2021
Bad Kitty Does Not Like Valentine's Day, 2022
Bad Kitty Chapter Books
Bad Kitty Gets a Bath, 2008
Happy Birthday, Bad Kitty, 2009
Bad Kitty vs. Uncle Murray, 2010
Bad Kitty Meets the Baby, 2011
Bad Kitty for President, 2012
Bad Kitty School Daze, 2013
Bad Kitty Drawn to Trouble, 2014
Bad Kitty: Puppy's Big Day, 2015
Bad Kitty Goes to the Vet, 2016
Bad Kitty Takes the Test, 2017
Bad Kitty Camp Daze, 2018
Bad Kitty: Kitten Trouble, 2018
Bad Kitty Joins the Team, 2019
Bad Kitty Goes on Vacation, 2020
Bad Kitty Wants a Phone, 2021
Bad Kitty: Supercat, 2022

Awards

Bad Kitty

 2007 Buckaroo Book Award—Children's (Winner)
 2007 North Carolina Children's Book Award—Picture Book (Nominee)
 2007 South Carolina Childrens, Junior and Young Adult Book Award—Picture Book (Nominee)
 2007 Volunteer State Book Award—Grades K-3 (Winner)
 2008 Colorado Children's Book Award—Picture Book (Runner-Up)
 2008 Monarch Award—Grades K-3 (Second Place)
 2009 Young Hoosier Book Award—Picture Book (Winner)

Bad Kitty Gets A Bath

 2009 Gryphon Award—Children's Literature (Honor Book)
 2011 Beverly Cleary Children's Choice Award (Winner)
 2011 Golden Archer Award—Intermediate (Nominee)
 2012 Nevada Young Readers' Award—Young Readers (Nominee)

Bad Kitty Meets The Baby

 2012 Third and Fourth Grade Book of the Year—Children's Book Council

Bad Kitty For President

 2013 Third and Fourth Grade Book of the Year—Children's Book Council

Bad Kitty: School Daze

 2014 Colorado Children's Book Award—Junior Novel (Runner-Up)
 2016 Monarch Award—Grades K-3 (Nominee)

Who Is Melvin Bubble?

 2008 Black-Eyed Susan Award—Picture Book (Nominee)
 2008 Washington Children's Choice Picture Book Award—Picture Book (Nominee)
 2009 North Carolina Children's Book Award—Picture Book (Winner)

References

External links
 
 Publisher's Author Page*

1978 births
Living people
American children's writers
American illustrators